Punta di Valloprare is a mountain in the Province of Macerata, Marche, Italy in the Monti Sibillini National Park, at 1776m above mean sea level.

Name
The mountain is called Punta di Valloprare because the valley near it is Valloprare.

Near villages
Near the mountain there are Gualdo, Spina di Gualdo and Rapegna, frazioni of Castelsantangelo sul Nera.

Connections
Punta di Valloprare is connected to Gualdo, Monte Pian Falcone and Monte Lieto.

Mountains of Marche
Mountains of the Apennines